Joe Earl Bostic, Jr. (born April 20, 1957) is a former American football offensive lineman, primarily guard, who played ten seasons in the National Football League (NFL) for the St. Louis/Phoenix Cardinals. He is the older brother of former Washington Redskins center Jeff Bostic.

He and former Philadelphia Eagles player Steve Kenney own Kenney Construction.
He is also the father of three children: Jennifer, Kathryn, and Mark.

Graduated from Ben L. Smith High School in Greensboro, North Carolina

References 

1957 births
Living people
American football offensive linemen
St. Louis Cardinals (football) players
Phoenix Cardinals players
Clemson Tigers football players
Ed Block Courage Award recipients